Dendrobium antennatum, commonly known as the green antelope orchid, is an epiphytic orchid in the family Orchidaceae. It has cylindrical pseudobulbs with up to twelve leaves near their tips and up to fifteen white flowers with green petals and a white labellum with purple stripes. It grows in New Guinea and in tropical North Queensland where it is rare.

Description
The side lobes curve upwards and the middle lobe in pointed with five ridges along its midline. Flowering occurs from March to December and the flowers are long-lasting.

Taxonomy and naming
Dendrobium antennatum was first formally described in 1843 by John Lindley from a specimen collected in New Guinea by Richard Brinsley Hinds.

Distribution and habitat

Conservation
This orchid is classed as "endangered" under the Australian Government Environment Protection and Biodiversity Conservation Act 1999.

References

antennatum
Orchids of Queensland
Endemic orchids of Australia
Plants described in 1843